Oliver Samuel  (1849 – 11 January 1925) was a 19th-century Member of Parliament from Taranaki in New Zealand.

Born in Saint Helier, Jersey in 1849, Samuel emigrated to New Zealand with his family in 1855. He was educated at Nelson College from 1863 to 1865. In 1883, he married Rosamond Carrington, a daughter of the surveyor Octavius Carrington who, alongside his brother Frederic Carrington, was regarded as a father of New Plymouth.

On 22 January 1907, he was appointed to the Legislative Council. He was reappointed on 14 July 1914 and 14 July 1921. He remained a member until his death on 11 January 1925. From 19 November 1918 until his death, he was Chairman of Committees. On 24 December 1919, he was appointed King's Counsel.

Samuel died on 11 January 1925 at New Plymouth, and was buried at Te Henui Cemetery.

See also
 List of King's and Queen's Counsel in New Zealand

Notes

References

|-

1849 births
1925 deaths
People from Saint Helier
Jersey emigrants to New Zealand
People educated at Nelson College
Members of the New Zealand House of Representatives
New Zealand MPs for North Island electorates
Members of the New Zealand Legislative Council
People from New Plymouth
New Zealand King's Counsel
19th-century New Zealand politicians
Burials at Te Henui Cemetery